Jacek Żalek (born 13 January 1973 in Białystok) is a Polish politician. He is a member of the VI, VII, VIII and IX Sejm. He is also a member of the Agreement political party. 

During the 2020 Polish presidential election campaign Żalek has stated in a live television broadcast that "LGBT are not people, it's an ideology". He then said that there were homosexuals before the LGBT movement, after which he was kicked from the studio. He later stated that making it seem that he said "LGBT aren't people" was a manipulation on the part of the journalist.

References 

1973 births
Living people
Members of the Polish Sejm 2007–2011
Members of the Polish Sejm 2015–2019
Members of the Polish Sejm 2011–2015
Members of the Polish Sejm 2019–2023
People from Białystok